The year 652 BC was a year of the pre-Julian Roman calendar. In the Roman Empire, it was known as year 102 Ab urbe condita . The denomination 652 BC for this year has been used since the early medieval period, when the Anno Domini calendar era became the prevalent method in Europe for naming years.

Events

Middle East 
 Elam withdraws from her alliance with king Shamash-shum-ukin of Babylon, who launches a premature attack on his half brother Ashurbanipal at year's end without waiting for reinforcements that have been promised by the Egyptian king Psamtik I.

Asia 
 Guan Zhong, Chinese chancellor, urges Duke Huan of Qi to attack the small neighboring State of Xing which is under attack from Quan Rong nomads. Later, he advises the duke not to ally with a vassal ruler's son who wishes to depose his father.

Births

Deaths 
 Hui of Zhou, ruler of the Zhou Dynasty

References